Leo Fernandez (born 5 July 1976 in Limerick) is an Irish former professional snooker player.

Snooker career
Fernandez finished second on the PIOS Order of Merit in 2007 gaining promotion to the Main Tour for the 2007–08 season, although he failed to finish inside the top 64 and was relegated after that season. He has been on and off the Main Tour a few times during his career, failing to make any significant impact each time. He suffered from testicular cancer in 2005 but continued playing while he recovered.

His best ranking event display came when he reached the last 16 of the 2003 Welsh Open, defeating opponents including fellow Irishman Fergal O'Brien and Mark King. He qualified for the 1999 World Championship but drew Ronnie O'Sullivan and lost 10–3. He also reached the final qualifying round in 2004, losing 10–8 to Dominic Dale. He was Jamie Burnett's opponent in 2004 UK Championship qualifying when Burnett scored a 148 break, the first ever break in excess of 147 in a professional match.

As an amateur, Fernandez reached the final of English Amateur Championship in 2010, losing to Jack Lisowski, playing in the tournament again in 2011 and winning the title, victorious 10–6 in the final over John Whitty. He entered Q-School in 2015 and made it to the final round before losing 4–1 to Rhys Clark. In October 2015, Fernandez played in the Asian Tour, and reached quarter-finals of the Haining Open before losing 4–1 to world number 11 Ricky Walden. This need being enough for Fernandez to qualify the main tour, however Fernandez was suspended from the sport of snooker for a period of 15 months following corruption charges and would not be eligible to participate in snooker events before 27 August 2017.

In November 2017, Fernandez beat the world number three player Ding Junhui in the UK Championship coming from 5-1 behind to defeat the two-time former UK Champion 6–5 at the York Barbican.

Personal life
Fernandez was born in Limerick, Ireland, but lives in Kendal England.

Match fixing ban
Fernandez was given a 15-month ban by the World Professional Billiards and Snooker Association (WPBSA) in July 2016 for admitting to a breach of their corruption rules.

After suspicious betting was placed on who would commit the first foul in the first frame, Fernandez admitted to playing that shot intentionally in order to aid those who had placed the bets in question. He was banned from 27 May 2016 to 27 August 2017, while he was fined €2,000 and made to assist the WPBSA in its anti-corruption education work.

Performance and rankings timeline

Career finals

Non-ranking finals: 3 (2 titles)

Pro-am finals: 4 (3 titles)

Amateur finals: 4 (3 titles)

References

External links
Leo Fernandez CueTracker.net: Snooker Results and Statistic Database
Leo Fernandez at worldsnooker.com
Leo Fernandez profile Global Snooker Centre

Irish snooker players
Living people
1976 births
Sportspeople from Limerick (city)